Zackenberg (or ZERO - Zackenberg Ecological Research Operations), or Zackenberg Research Station, is an ecosystem research station and monitoring facility situated in the Northeast Greenland National Park in northeastern Greenland. The station is owned by the Greenland Self-Government and was run by the Danish Polar Center (Dansk Polarcenter) until 2008. In 2009 the running of the Station was transferred to the Dept of Arctic Environment at the Danish National Environmental Research Institute

Geography 
Near the Zackenberg Station is the Zackenberg River, part of a fjord with outflow glaciers. The Freya Glacier is located on Clavering Island 10km southeast of the Zackenberg Research Station.

Climate
Zackenberg Station is situated in a tundra climate (ET), with long, cold winters and short, cool summers. Despite its high humidity, precipitation is relatively low.

Facilities
Zackenberg has 10 buildings holding scientific equipment and laboratories, living accommodations and a communication room. The station can host up to 20 persons at the same time with additional 10 persons at the branch facility at Daneborg. Zackenberg Station has normally been open for scientists from June to August but since 2007 the season has been extended from approximately May to October. Research takes place within the framework ZERO (Zackenberg Ecological Research Operations) dealing with issues concerning ecosystem science.

History
A group of experienced scientists investigated various potential locations for a new research facility in Northeast Greenland in 1991 and concluded that the position near the Zackenberg Elv delta was optimal. The construction of the station was started in 1995 and the station was officially opened in August 1997.

See also
List of research stations in the Arctic

References

External links

Zackenberg Research Station
 About Zackenberg
 Zackenberg homepage

Research stations in Greenland
Arctic research
Buildings and structures completed in 1997